Billie Jean King successfully defended her title, defeating Chris Evert in the final, 6–0, 7–5 to win the ladies' singles tennis title at the 1973 Wimbledon Championships.

Seeds

  Margaret Court (semifinals)
  Billie Jean King (champion)
  Evonne Goolagong (semifinals)
  Chris Evert (final)
  Rosie Casals (quarterfinals)
  Virginia Wade (quarterfinals)
  Kerry Melville (quarterfinals)
  Olga Morozova (quarterfinals)

For the first time since 1954, all eight seeded players reached the quarter-final stage of the tournament.

Qualifying

Draw

Finals

Top half

Section 1

Section 2

Section 3

Section 4

Bottom half

Section 5

Section 6

Section 7

Section 8

References

External links

1973 Wimbledon Championships – Women's draws and results at the International Tennis Federation

Women's Singles
Wimbledon Championship by year – Women's singles
Wimbledon Championships
Wimbledon Championships